The Paris Hotel, formerly known as the Washington Hotel, is an historic structure located at 759 4th Avenue in San Diego's Gaslamp Quarter, in the U.S. state of California. It was built in 1910 and is currently owned by DRA Enterprises. Accommodations within the facilities are either shared or separate, and included en-suite bathrooms and twice weekly housekeeping services.

History 
The Paris Hotel opened as the Washington Hotel in 1910, before changing names to the Paris Hotel years later.

See also 
 List of Gaslamp Quarter historic buildings

References

External links 

 

1910 establishments in California
Buildings and structures in San Diego
Gaslamp Quarter, San Diego
Hotel buildings completed in 1910
Hotels in San Diego